Khajuri Khurd is a panchayat village in Koraon Tehsil in Allahabad District, Uttar Pradesh, India. Khajuri means Date Palm and Khurd means small. Khurd and Kalan Persian language word which means small and Big respectively when two villages have same name then it is distinguished as Kalan means Big and Khurd means Small with Village Name.It is approximately 1.5 km (by road) south of the village of Khajuri Kalan, and about 2 km (by road) northeast of the village of Kukurhata. Administratively, it is a gram panchayat under Koraon Tehsil. There are six villages in the Khajuri Khurd gram panchayat: Khajuri Khurd, Chak Dadar, Khajuri Kalan, Koilariha, Pachauha, and Patka Bodaha.

In the 2001 census, the village of Khajuri Khurd had a population of 2,012, with 1,036 males and 976 females.

Notes

Villages in Allahabad district